Barbara Harrison may refer to:
Barbara Harrison Wescott (1904–1977), American publisher, née Barbara Harrison
Barbara Grizzuti Harrison (1934–2002), American writer
Barbara Jane Harrison (1945–1968), British air stewardess and recipient of the George Cross

See also
Barbara Harrisson (1922–2015), German-British art historian who also contributed scientifically to nature conservation, primatology, anthropology, and archaeology